Peleg is a masculine given name, and occasional surname. Historically, Peleg was one of the two sons of Eber, the ancestor of the Hebrews. 

Others with the name include:

Given name 
Canada 
Peleg Wiswall, lawyer, judge, and politician, Nova Scotia

United States
Peleg Arnold, lawyer, tavern-keeper, jurist, and statesman from Smithfield, Rhode Island
Peleg Chandler, lawyer, journalist, and politician
Peleg Coffin, Jr., financier, insurer, and politician
Peleg Sprague, politician from Maine
Peleg Sprague, politician from New Hampshire
Peleg Tallman, Representative from Massachusetts
Peleg Wadsworth, officer during the Revolutionary War, and a Congressman

Surname 
 Israel
David Peleg, historian and diplomat
David Peleg (scientist), computer scientist
Israel Peleg (born 1949), politician
Anat Peleg (born 1957), author
Shtain Peleg (born 1996), composer

See also 
Peleg (disambiguation)
Peleg (Paleg, Phaleg)

References

Hebrew masculine given names
English masculine given names
Hebrew-language surnames